The online Gandhi Heritage Portal preserves, protects, and disseminates original writings of Mohandas K. Gandhi and makes available to the world the large corpus of “Fundamental Works” which are useful for any comprehensive study of the life and thought of Gandhiji.
Gandhiji was 24 years old in South Africa "Natal Indian Congress " made in 1894.

The Government of India and its Ministry of Culture, acting on the recommendation of the Gandhi Heritage Sites Committee headed by Shri Gopal Krishna Gandhi, gave the responsibility of conceptualising, designing, developing and maintaining the Gandhi Heritage Portal to the Sabarmati Ashram Preservation and Memorial Trust.

The Collected Works of Mahatma Gandhi (100 volumes), Gandhiji No Akshar Deha (82 volumes) and Sampoorna Gandhi Vangmaya (97 volumes) form the basic structure around which the Portal has been developed. The key texts provide first editions of the Key Texts of Gandhi. These are: Hind Swaraj, Satyagraha in South Africa, An Autobiography or The Story of My Experiments with Truth, From Yervada Mandir, Ashram Observances in Action, Constructive Programmes: Their Meaning and Place, Key To Health, and Gandhi's translation of the Gita as Anasakti Yoga.

The Fundamental Works are those through which The Collected Works of Mahatma Gandhi (CWMG) was created, for instance the Mahadevbhai Ni Diary. Over time the Portal plans to provide all the collected works.

The Journals provide electronic versions of Indian Opinion, Navajivan, Young India, Harijan, Harijan Bandhu, and Harijan Sevak. A sub-section provides some of the journals which make for a fuller archive of the Gandhian imagination and scholarship. At present the Portal has placed as representation Gandhi Marg (Hindi & English), Bhoomi Putra, Pyara Bapu and the unique handwritten journal of the Satyagraha Ashram Madhpudo, which among other things carried Prabhudas Gandhi's Jivan Nu Parodh and Kakasaheb Kalelkar's Smaran Yatra. The Portal hopes to include many more journals as it acquires these overtime.

Other Works is a section that takes into account the commentarial and memoire literature.

The Life and Times section is under development, and will provide information that could lead the reader to explore the data. The Gallery will provide audio, visual, and film material as well as images of caricatures, paintings and postage stamps. The Portal provides a sample of each of these.

The Gandhi Heritage Sites, under development and verification, will provide multiple layers of information regarding places that Gandhiji visited. The information will contain references to primary sources about these visits as well.

The Collected Works Of Mahatma Gandhi
In 1956 Government of India initiated a project unmatched in its aspiration. This was to provide an authentic documentation of all available writings of Gandhiji. The Collected Works of Mahatma Gandhi is a result of this meticulous and conscientious effort, which concluded in 1994. It was decided that Gandhiji writings should be made available in three languages: Gujarati, English and Hindi. Consequently, Gandhiji No Akshardeha (Gujarati) and Sampoorna Gandhi Vangmaya (Hindi) were created based upon the editorial architecture determined for the CWMG. At present there are 100 volumes of the CWMG, 82 volumes of Gandhiji No Akshardeha and 97 volumes of Sampoorna Gandhi Vangmaya.

These volumes provide information about the source of these writings as also the language in which they were originally written. Volumes 1 to 90 of the CWMG follow chronological order, while volumes 91-97 are supplementary volumes created to accommodate new material that came to be acquired subsequent to the publication of the series. Volumes 98 and 99 are Index of Subjects and Index of Persons respectively. Volume 100 is the compilation of Prefaces to the preceding volumes.

The Gandhi Heritage Portal provides unabridged, complete sets of these. These are available in two options: archival version and enhanced version, which is a black and white version. These volumes are interlinked through a database that the Portal team has developed. It allows one to move between the three languages and search the same item. This would enable the user to compare and study their texts and explore questions of translation. The search criteria for these are as defined in volumes 98 and 99 of CWMG. The Portal is committed to provide a searchable ebook of the CWMG, based on the first edition.

The Key Texts
Gandhiji wrote seven books and did a Gujarati translation of the Bhagvad Gita. These eight texts form the section Key Texts. These are Hind Swaraj, Satyagraha in South Africa, An Autobiography or The Story of My Experiments with Truth, From Yervada Mandir, Ashram Observances in Action, Constructive Programmes: Their Meaning and Place, Key To Health, and Gandhi's translation of the Gita as Anasakti Yoga.

These are arranged in a chronological order. The section also provides a history of their printing and translations. Hind Swaraj, which Gandhiji considered as a “seed text”, illustrates this. The Portal provides a facsimile edition of his manuscript, which was written on board the steamer  between 13 and 22 November 1909. This is followed by the first Gujarati edition printed in the two issues of Indian Opinion (11 December 1909 and 18 December 1909). Gandhiji translated this into English as Indian Home Rule in 1910, subsequent to the proscription imposed upon the Gujarati edition by the Government of Bombay in March 1910. The English translation is followed by a Hindi translation. Similar order is followed in case of all other texts, albeit facsimile editions of other key texts are not available.

An attempt has been made to provide first editions of all the works, including translations. Gandhi was acutely sensitive to the question of translation. The translations of his Key Texts were done by his closest associates including Mahadev Desai and Valji Govindji Desai. Gandhi read, revised and authenticated these translations.

The Portal also provides rare copies of some of these key texts. The Navajivan of 29 November 1925 carried the first instalment of Gandhiji's autobiography; Satya Na Prayogo, and the last chapter 'Farewell" were published in the issue of 3 February 1929 of the same magazine. Mahadev Desai's English translation of it commenced with the 3 December 1925 issue of Young India and continued till that of 3 February 1929. The first edition of the English translation The Story of My Experiments with Truth was published in two volumes: the first containing three parts was issued in 1927, and the second, containing parts IV and V, in 1929. The second revised edition of the autobiography was issued in 1940 with a new title: An Autobiography or The Story of My Experiments with Truth. The edition of the autobiography placed on the Portal is not only the first English edition, it is that copy on which careful revisions from the point of view of language were suggested by Rt. Hon. Sir V. S. Srinivasa Sastri.

The Portal also provides translations of these texts in other languages. At present we have An Autobiography or The Story of My Experiments with Truth available in thirteen languages. The aspiration is to make available as many translations of the key texts as possible, either in full or with complete bibliographic information.

Fundamental Works
Fundamental Works are those works, which form the source of the CWMG. These include diaries, memoires, selections from compilations of letters and biographies. It is not possible to imagine the CWMG without the extraordinary diaries of Mahadev Desai, Gandhiji's closest companion from 1917 to 1942. The Fundamental Works provide three language editions of Mahadev Bhai Ni Diary. Similarly, the published works of Manubehn Gandhi also form part of the Fundamental Works.

There is a rich and long biographical tradition of recounting Gandhiji's life, which commenced with Rev. Joseph Doke's M K Gandhi: An Indian Patriot in South Africa and include such magnificent works as Pyarelal's The Early Phase and The Last Phase, D G Tendulkar's eight-volume biography Mahatma and Narayan Desai's Maru Jivan Ej Mari Vani. These form part of the Fundamental Works. Also included are works of Gandhi's associates like C F Andrews and Mirabehn.

This section also includes various translations of the Key Texts. The aspiration is to provide authoritative selections of Gandhiji's writings in various languages in this section. The Fundamental Works would also include all available volumes of translations of the CWMG in other Indian languages, for example Marathi.

Journals
Gandhi's endeavour was to reach out and communicate with as many people and opinions as possible. Publication of periodic journals published in multiple languages was one such mode of communication. The Portal provides complete sets of the journals that he owned, edited or published. These include: Indian Opinion, Navajivan, Young India, Harijan, Harijan Bandhu and Harijan Sevak.

Gandhi's ideas and practices have inspired many movements and academic inquires. “Journals by Others” presents a selection of journals published by institutions and movements, which seek to interrogate Gandhi's ideas and practices or record, documents and chronicle movements. These include Gandhi Marg (Hindi & English), Bhoomi Putra, Pyara Bapu, Kasturba Darshan and that unique handwritten journal of the Sataygraha Ashram Madhpudo. Full, unabridged texts of these journals are made available. This section would become an archive of the Gandhian imagination and scholarship. The Portal plans to provide an ever expanding list of such journals.

Other works
Other works is a broad category, which seeks to provide either full, unabridged texts or complete bibliographic information on the vast and ever expanding scholarship on Gandhiji and allied movements and institutions. This section also includes works of those who are crucial interlocutors of Gandhiji; C F Andrews is one example. It is difficult to understand and fully appreciate the striving of Gandhiji in absence of the works of his interlocutors.

This section would eventually include either full texts or bibliographic information on writings on Gandhi and his endeavours in academic journals. This will facilitate a more comprehensive access to the contemporary scholarship around these issues.

Life And Times
This section provides selections, slivers of information arranged for easy reference. All the selections are made from the “Chronologies” that are given as a separate section and other Fundamental Works. Information about tours, marches, Satyagrahas, imprisonments, fasts and assaults are arranged in tabular form. For instance the Dandi March is presented through four subsections: “Background to the Salt Satyagraha”, “The Marchers”, “The March” and “Events post March”. A virtual tour mapping the walk to Dandi is also provided. The information is also linked to the sources in the CWMG to enable further study.

Gandhi Heritage Sites
Gandhi moved across the Indian subcontinent and other parts of the world to carry his message of freedom, truth, nonviolence, Satyagraha, Swadeshi and equality for all. This was his way of inhabiting the land and being one with her people.

The Gandhi Heritage Sites Committee has designated thirty-nine locations as core sites. At present a detailed site specific chronology is being prepared at the Sabarmati Ashram Preservation and Memorial Trust. The classification framework includes place, persons, principles and events which will be linked to the source and presented on the Portal.

The GHP at present
The Portal at present provides approximately 500,000 pages of material in electronic format. In case of CWMG and the Key Texts both archival and enhanced black and white images are provided. In addition to the textual material it has over 1000 photographs, 21 films and 78 audio recordings. While most of the data is interlinked and searchable, at present the search criteria are those which have been determined by Volumes 98 and 99 of CWMG, that is the Index of Subjects and Index of Persons.

Goals
The Portal plans to make available a searchable electronic edition of The Collected Works of Mahatma Gandhi based on the first editions. The Trust is also working on a comprehensive compendium on the Gandhi Heritage Sites, which would be made available on the Portal.

The Portal plans to place about a million pages of information in multiple languages. These will include Journals, Fundamental Works, and Other Works.

The Trust is also in the process of developing an on-line variorum of Gandhiji's manuscripts, and will make available about 150,000 pages of original manuscripts. The variorum will be searchable through the catalogues of the Sabarmati Ashram archives. The Portal will collaborate with other national institutions such as the National Archives of India and the Nehru Memorial Museum and Library to make the variorum as comprehensive as possible.

References

External links
Gandhi Heritage Portal
The Collected Works of Mahatma Gandhi
Mahatma Gandhi Pictures
Sabarmati Ashram
Mahatma Gandhi Family Tree

Mahatma Gandhi
Cultural depictions of Mahatma Gandhi
2013 establishments in India